Elkhart Independent School District is a public school district based in Elkhart, Texas (USA). The district is located in southwest Anderson County and extends into northern Houston County.  A small portion of the district extends to the city of Palestine.

In 2009, the school district was rated "academically acceptable" by the Texas Education Agency.

The district superintendent is Dr. Lamont Smith, who was selected to lead the district in 2018.
The school was founded on March 8, 1888 which served as a coeducational school

Schools
Elkhart ISD has five schools:

Elkhart High School (Grades 9-12)
Elkhart Middle School (Grades 6-8)
Elkhart Intermediate School (Grades 3-5)
Elkhart Elementary School (Grades EE-2)
Elkhart DAEP (Grades KG-12)

References

External links
Elkhart ISD

School districts in Anderson County, Texas
School districts in Houston County, Texas